The former Franklin County Jail is a historic building at 3rd and River Streets in Ozark, Arkansas.  It is a two-story masonry structure, built out of native sandstone.  It is roughly cubic in shape, with a flat roof obscured by a crenellated parapet, and its entrance set in a Romanesque arch.  It was built in 1914, and has been rehabilitated to house professional offices.

The building was listed on the National Register of Historic Places in 1982.

See also
National Register of Historic Places listings in Franklin County, Arkansas

References

Jails on the National Register of Historic Places in Arkansas
Buildings and structures completed in 1914
Buildings and structures in Franklin County, Arkansas
National Register of Historic Places in Franklin County, Arkansas